The Australian Women's Amateur is the national amateur golf championship of Australia. It was first played in 1894 and is organised by Golf Australia. Having traditionally been a match play event, it became a 72-hole stroke play event in 2021, having last been played as a stroke play event in 1927.

History
In 1894 the ladies of the Geelong and Melbourne clubs started an annual "Ladies Championship", to be played alternately on the two courses, the first event to be held at Geelong. The precise status of the event is unclear with some reports calling it the "Ladies' Championship of Victoria" and others the "Ladies' Championship of Australia". It was initially decided by a bogey competition over two rounds. Evelyn MacKenzie finished 9 down on bogey, two holes better than Jean Davie. McKenzie won again in 1895 at Royal Melbourne, this time a score of 1 up, and for a third time at Geelong in 1896, finishing 6 down but 12 holes better than anyone else. McKenzie did not complete in 1897 and Davie won the title. The format was changed to match-play in 1898 and was won by McKenzie who beat Ethel Guthrie in the final. In 1899 Louise Shaw won a close final at Royal Melbourne to win the title.

The Australian Golf Union was formed in 1898 and organised their first championship meeting at Royal Sydney in 1899, the main event being the Australian Amateur. The 1899 championship meeting did not include a ladies event but in 1900, when it was held at Adelaide Golf Club, a ladies championship was arranged before the men's event. It took the form of a 36-hole stroke-play event, played over two days. Evelyn Calder won with a score of 209, 23 strokes ahead of the runner-up, some sources referring to her as "the first lady champion of Australia". The Geelong/Royal Melbourne championship continued to be played and became clearly established as the "Ladies' Championship of Victoria" until the Victorian Ladies' Golf Union took over that event in 1907. The championship meeting returned to the Sydney area in 1901, being played at The Australian Golf Club. There was a separate ladies' championship meeting, held at Royal Sydney, starting immediately after the men's meeting, starting with a mixed foursomes event. Ethel Guthrie won the ladies championship with a score of 199. The 1902 championship meeting was held at Royal Melbourne for the first time, with the ladies championship following the men's events. The championship was extended to 54 holes and was won by Evelyn Calder. In 1903 the meeting returned to Adelaide Golf Club with the ladies championship played immediately before the men's event. Nellie De Little won with a score of 282.

In 1904 the men's championship meeting was held at The Australian Golf Club and included the first men's interstate team match and the first Australian Open. As in 1901, there was a separate ladies' championship meeting, held at Royal Sydney, although on this occasion it was held before the men's meeting. Mabel Trevor-Jones won the ladies championship by 10 strokes. From 1905 the ladies championship was played after the men's events, and the meeting eventually became known as "the open, amateur, and ladies' championship meeting" with the championships being played in that order. Myrtle Backhouse, a British visitor, won in 1905 with Elvie Whitesides from Tasmania winning in 1906. Leonora Wray had successive wins in 1907 and 1908 with Nellie Gatehouse taking the title in 1909. A different format was used in 1910 and 1911. There was a 36-hole qualifying stage after which the leading 8 played match-play, all matches being over 18 holes. Nancy Parbury won both times. The event returned to stroke-play in 1912 and resulted in a tie between Violet Binnie and Florence Fowler. The 18-hole playoff was very one-sided with Fowler conceding the match on the 15th hole. There was another Tasmanian winner in 1913, with Lucy Harrison taking the title.

The championship restarted in 1920 using the pre-war format of 54 holes of stroke-play. As previously it was played the week after the men's amateur championship. The Australian Ladies’ Golf Union was founded in 1921 and jointly ran the event with the Australian Golf Union. Eileen Hope Williams, from New Zealand, won the championship in 1920. Mona MacLeod won in 1921, by 14 strokes, and won again in 1926 and 1927. Other winners included Gladys Hay in 1922, Beth Newton Lees in 1924 and Nellie Gatehouse who won for a second time in 1925.

In 1928 the format was extended and the championship was separated from the AGU championship meeting. There was a 36-hole stroke-play stage with the leading 16 qualified for the match-play which finished with a 36-hole final. Mona MacLeod, the defending champion, led the qualifying but lost 9&8 to Nellie Gatehouse in the final, Gatehouse winning her third title. Leonora Wray won in 1929, having previously won in 1907 and 1908. Susie Tolhurst won in 1930 and 1931. In 1930 she led the qualifiers and went on to beat Jess Russell in a close final. In 1931 she met Mona MacLeod in the final, winning 7&6. Tolhurst led the qualifying in 1932 but the final saw MacLeod beating Russell 4&2. New Zealander Oliver Kay led the qualifying in 1933 and went on to win the title, beating Joan Hammond 9&8 in the final. Kay was part of the New Zealand team that was competing in the first Women's Tasman Cup. Kay and fellow New Zealander Bessie Gaisford led the qualifying in 1934 but Nin Robinson won the title after beating Gaisford in the final. Qualifying in 1935 was dominated by the British and Irish players who were touring Australia. They took 5 of the first 6 places, with only Susie Morpeth  Tolhurst, splitting them. Morpeth reached the final but lost to Pat Walker from Ireland. In 1936, two of the New Zealand team competing in the Women's Tasman Cup reached the final. Oliver Kay beat Bessie Fullerton-Smith 5&4. Betty Kernot won the title in 1937 and 1938, beating Burtta Cheney and Vedas Ebert. In 1939, Joan Lewis led the qualifying with Barbara Crago second. The two met in the final with Lewis winning 2&1.

The championship restarted in 1947. The 1939 champion, Joan Lewis, now Joan Fisher, beating the 1937 and 1938 champion, Betty Kernot, in the final. Pat Borthwick won in 1948 and 1949 having also led the qualifying both times. 19-year-old Janette Wellard won in 1950 and she was followed by Maxine Bishop in 1951, who beat Borthwick in a close final. Fisher won for the third time in 1952, beating Bishop in the final, while Borthwick won her third title in 1953. In 1954 Judith Percy won her first title, beating New Zealander Doreen Blundell in the final.

The players in 1955 included a British women's team that was touring Australia and New Zealand in the second half of the year, all aged between 18 and 21. One of them, Veronica Anstey won the championship, beating Joan Fletcher 10&9 in the final. Fletcher reached the final again in 1956 but lost to Pat Borthwick, who won her fourth title. In 1958 18-year-old New Zealander Nicki Campbell reached the final but lost to Margaret Masters. Two ex-champions reached the final in 1960, Judith Percy beating Borthwick by one hole. In 1961 18-year-old Beatrice Hayley beat Enid Hauritz 13&11, the largest winning margin in any final. Percy won for the third time in 1962, beating Masters 6&4.

In 1963 a number of overseas golfer competed, having played in the recent Commonwealth Trophy. Marlene Streit, a memberof the Canadian team, led the qualifying by 10 strokes and went on to win the title, beating one of the British team, Ruth Porter, 8&7 in the final. In 1964, 18-year-old Marea Hickey won the title and she won again in 1969. Gail Corry.won in 1965 and retained the title in 1966. Judy Perkins was another repeat winner, winning in 1967 and again in 1970. Lindy Goggin won in 1971, the first Tasmanian winner since 1913.

In 1972 Sandra McCaw won her first title beating Lindy Goggin in the final. The 1973 championship included a large number of overseas entries, playing in the five-nation Women's International Series the following week. Maisie Mooney, a member of the Great Britain and Ireland team, beat Jane Lock in the final. In 1974 the qualifying was extended to 72-holes for the first time, with a cut after two rounds. McCaw won the second time beating Lock in the final. The same format was retained in 1975. Lock lead the qualification stage and she went on to win the title. 1976 saw a repeat of 1975 with Lock leading the qualifiying, this time by 9 strokes, and retaining the title. Lock failed to qualify in 1977, with Lindy Goggin and Jane Crafter leading the stroke-play. Goggin and Crafter met in the final, Goggin winning 4&2.

The format returned to the earlier system in 1978, with 32 qualifiers from a 36-hole stroke-play stage. Karen Permezel won the title. The 1979 championship was played soon after the Commonwealth Trophy, resulting in a larger than usual number of overseas entries. However two Australians, Jane Lock and Edwina Kennedy reached the final, Lock winning her third title, 4&3. Lindy Goggin won her third title in 1980, beating Denise Hutton in the final. 19-year-old Corinne Dibnah won the title in 1981, although 17-year-old Diane Mancell had led the qualifying. The 1982 championship was preceded by a 6-team international pairs event won by Great Britain. The championship was won by Regine Lautens, a member of the Swiss team, who beat Goggin in the final. Sandra McCaw became another three-tine winner in 1983. 1983 was the last that the Australian junior title was contested during the qualifying stage of the championship. From 1984 it became a separate match-play event.

Winners

Source

Stroke-play qualifying
Stroke-play qualifying was first used in 1910 and 1911 when the championship was first decided by match play. 36 holes were played over two days with the leading eight qualifying. Nellie Gatehouse led with a score of 161. Nancy Parbury led in 1911 with a score of 170 and went on to win the championship.

Stroke-play qualifying was again used when the championship again became a match play event in 1928. The leading 16 players qualified. A seeded draw, based on the position in the qualifying, was introduced in 1948. The number of qualifier was increased to 32 for the 1955 and 1958 events, but otherwise the number remained at 16 until 1961 when it was increased to 32. In 1964 and 1965 the number of qualifiers was reduced to 16, returning to 32 in 1966. In 1972, the stroke-play stage was extended to 72 holes to give players more practise for the forthcoming Espirito Santo Trophy. Qualifying was still based on scores at the 36-hole stage, with 16 players advancing to the match-play stage. In 1973 the number of qualifiers returned to 32.

From 1974 to 1977 the qualifying was extended to 72-holes, with a cut after two rounds. 16 players advanced to the match-play. From 1978 the format returned to the earlier system with 32 qualifiers from a 36-hole stroke-play stage. From 2008 to 2011 qualification was based on the result of the Australian Women's Amateur Stroke Play Championship but that event was discontinued after 2011 and 36-hole qualifying was reintroduced in 2012. The leading qualifier received the Una Clift bowl.

2020 Emily Toy (136)
2019 Doey Choi, Sae Ogura, Yuri Yoshida+ (140)
2018 Cho A-yean (137)
2017 Choi Hye-jin (136)
2016 Minami Katsu (142)
2015 Lee So-young (143)
2014 Lee So-young (138)
2013 Lydia Ko, Grace Lennon+ (140)
2012 Breanna Elliott (145)
2008 to 2011 - replaced by the Australian Women's Amateur Stroke Play Championship
2007 Sarah Oh+, and others (143)
2006 Frances Bondad (141)
2005 Anna Parsons (144)
2004 Katy Jarochowicz (145)
2003 Sarah Kemp (146)
2002 Rebecca Coakley (143)
2001 Nadina Taylor (143)
2000 Anna Rawson (147)
1999 Anna Rawson (144)
1998 Michelle Ellis (147)
1997 Melissa Fraser (143)
1996 Tamie Durdin (149)
1995 Lisa Walton (147)
1994 Tanya  Holl, Terri McKinnon+, Gina Scott (152)
1993 Joanne Mills (143)
1992 Loraine Lambert (152)
1991 Louise Briers (153)
1990 Louise Briers, Terri McKinnon+ (149)
1989 Wendy Doolan+, Jan Higgins (154)
1988 Helene Andersson (153)
1987 Cheryl Cowie (149)
1986 Louise Briers, Brenda Ormsby+ (148)
1985 Sandra McCaw (150)
1984 Helen Hopkins+, Sandra McCaw, Louise Mullard (154)
1983 Lindy Goggin (149)
1982 Edwina Kennedy (149)
1981 Diane Mancell (148)
1980 Sandra McCaw (148)
1979 Louise Briers, Jane Crafter, Lindy Goggin+, Jane Lock (152)
1978 Carole Blair, Jill Miles+ (149)
1977 Jane Crafter+, Lindy Goggin (309)
1976 Jane Lock (307)
1975 Jane Lock (298)
1974 Liz Cavill (316)
1973 Takako Kiyomoto (152)
1972 Gayle Gannon, Dawn Macdonald+ (152)
1971 Rhys Wright (153)
1970 Elizabeth Blackmore+, Dianna Thomas (160)
1969 Heather Booth (143)
1968 Anne Kenny (149)
1967 Beatrice Turner (157)
1966 Carol Blair+, Dianna Thomas (155)
1965 Dianna Thomas (153)
1964 Joan Fletcher (159)
1963 Marlene Streit (146)
1962 Margaret Masters (149)
1961 Judith Percy (156)
1960 Pat Borthwick (159)
1959 Eileen Dawson+, Helen Stockman (157)
1958 Joan Fletcher+, Pam Main (152)
1957 Rhonda Watson (153)
1956 Joan Fletcher, Mardie Mair+ (152)
1955 June Gillespie+, Mardie Mair (156)
1954 June Gillespie (155)
1953 Esther Gaillie (158)
1952 Judith Percy (147)
1951 Mary Wheatley (157)
1950 Zoe Hudson (164)
1949 Pat Borthwick (156)
1948 Pat Borthwick (155)
1947 Sheila Fisher, Marie Roskin (160)
1939 Joan Lewis (152)
1938 Bessie Fullerton-Smith (159)
1937 Susie Tolhurst (164)
1936 Enid Clements, Oliver Kay (161)
1935 Jessie Anderson (161)
1934 Bessie Gaisford, Oliver Kay (161)
1933 Oliver Kay (157)
1932 Susie Tolhurst (168)
1931 Marion Bettington, Heather McCulloch (165)
1930 Susie Tolhurst (169)
1929 Hilda Britten-Jones (171)
1928 Mona MacLeod (159)

+ Number one seed.

See also
Australian Women's Amateur Stroke Play Championship
Australian Amateur
Australian Women's Interstate Teams Matches

References

External links

Amateur golf tournaments in Australia
Women's golf in Australia